Punugodu is a small village near Kanigiri in Prakasam district, Andhra Pradesh, India.

References 

Villages in Prakasam district